Palau Tiger Team was a Palauan association football club which competed in the Palau Soccer League, the top level league in Palau, in 2006–07, when they finished fourth losing 2–4 to Mount Everest Nepal in the third place play-off. Due to fragmentary records, it is not known how many other seasons they competed.

Players

2006/2007 Squad

References

Football clubs in Palau